The following discography lists albums by Bucky Pizzarelli.

Bucky Pizzarelli albums

With others
This section serves two purposes. It is for Bucky Pizzarelli efforts on the albums of others, and it is also designated for ensembles where the album is attributed to more than two musicians. For instance, the above section has collaborative efforts also, but in each instance Pizzarelli is named as either a leader or co-leader.

References

External links
 

 
Discographies of American artists
Jazz discographies